Ellobium aurismidae, common name Midas's ear shell, is a species of medium-sized, air-breathing, saltmarsh snails, terrestrial pulmonate gastropod mollusks in the family Ellobiidae.

Distribution
This species can be found in the Southwest-Pacific from China and Philippines to Indonesia, Peninsular Malaysia, Singapore and in the Australian states of Northern Territory and Queensland.

Description

Ellobium aurismidae is one of the largest members of the family. It has a shell reaching a size of 60 – 98 mm. The surface of this shell is usually brown or dark brown, but may also be white. The interior of the shell is white. The body of the animal is brown in colour.

Habitat
These hollow-shelled snails live in mud flats with vegetation, in mangrove swamps and salt marshes, but preferably away from direct contact with sea water.

References

External links

 
 Conchology

Ellobiidae
Gastropods described in 1758
Taxa named by Carl Linnaeus